Megaleg may refer to:

 Megaleg, a boss in the 2007 video game Super Mario Galaxy
 Megalegs, a 1982 Home system clone for the Atari 8-bit family by Megasoft in the video game Centipede
 Mega leg, the name of a double-length leg in The Amazing Race